Mitchell Jamieson (1915–1976) was an American painter. Jamieson was commissioned to paint a mural in what is now the Stewart Lee Udall Department of the Interior Building to commemorate Marion Anderson's famous concert at the Lincoln Memorial on April 9, 1939.  Titled An Incident in Contemporary American Life, the mural is still on view to the public who visit the building.

Life 

Jamieson was born in Kensington, Maryland, in 1915. He studied at the Abbott School of Art and the Corcoran School of Art. 

In the 1930s, he traveled to Key West and the United States Virgin Islands to paint under the Treasury Department's Art Project, and received commissions to paint murals for post offices in Upper Marlboro and Laurel, Maryland; Willard, Ohio; and at the Main Interior Building in Washington, D.C. His works are in collections at the White House, Corcoran Gallery of Art, Metropolitan Museum of Art, Brooklyn Museum, Whitney Museum of American Art, and the Seattle Art Museum.

During World War II, Jamieson served as a combat artist in the U.S. Navy. He sketched and painted the occupation on North Africa, the invasion of Sicily, the invasion of France, and the Okinawa invasion.

Jamieson died in 1976.

References

Biography

1915 births
1976 deaths
20th-century American painters
American male painters
People from Kensington, Maryland
Corcoran School of the Arts and Design alumni
Section of Painting and Sculpture artists